The Palace of the Marchioness of Sonora (Spanish: Palacio de la Marquesa de Sonora) is a palace located in Madrid, Spain. It was declared Bien de Interés Cultural in 1995.

References 

Palaces in Madrid
Bien de Interés Cultural landmarks in Madrid
Buildings and structures in Universidad neighborhood, Madrid